The early Jain contemplated the nature of the earth and universe and developed a detailed hypothesis on the various aspects of astronomy and cosmology. According to the Jain texts, the universe is divided into 3 parts:
 Urdhva Loka – the realms of the gods or heavens
 Madhya Loka – the realms of the humans, animals and plants
 Adho Loka – the realms of the hellish beings or the infernal regions

References

Citation

Source 
 
 
 
 

Jain cosmology
Jain philosophical concepts